Kampong Kiarong is a village in Brunei-Muara District, Brunei, as well as a neighbourhood in the country's capital Bandar Seri Begawan.

The village is home to Jame' Asr Hassanil Bolkiah, one of the two state mosques of Brunei.

Geography 

The village is home to Kiarong Roundabout in which the primary roads Sultan Hassanal Bolkiah Highway, Jalan Jame' 'Asr and Jalan Pasar Gadong (or Jalan Pasar Baharu) converge.

Administration 
Kampong Kiarong is one of the villages within Mukim Gadong 'B', a mukim in the district. It is also part of the municipal area of Bandar Seri Begawan. The village has the postcode BE1318.

Education 
Dato Ratna Haji Mohammad Jaafar Primary School is the village's government primary school. In 1985, the construction of the permanent building was completed and the school then became known as Kiarong Primary School. It finally adopted its current name on 20 October 2010 on the royal consent of Sultan Hassanal Bolkiah. It was named in honour of the first penghulu of Mukim Gadong who had made significant contribution to the local community. The school also shares grounds with Dato Ratna Haji Mohamed Ja'afar Religious School, the village's government school for the country's Islamic religious primary education.

The following educational institutions are located within the village's administrative boundary:
 Sultan Sharif Ali Islamic University (UNISSA)
 The Business Campus of the Institute of Brunei Technical Education (IBTE)
 Duli Pengiran Muda Al-Muhtadee Billah College (MDPMAMB), a sixth form college

Business 
The village is home to several office and retail complexes which contribute to the commercial activity of Bandar Seri Begawan and Brunei-Muara District in general. They are mainly clustered in two areas: the first is located near the residential area and Jame Asr Hassanil Bolkiah Mosque, and the other adjacent to Kiulap and Gadong commercial areas.

References 

Villages in Brunei-Muara District
Neighbourhoods in Bandar Seri Begawan